Sir Edmund Ivens Spriggs  (1871–1949) was a British physician and medical researcher for gastric and intestinal disorders.

After education at Market Harborough Grammar School and Wycliffe College, Gloucestershire, Edmund Spriggs was indentured at the age of eighteen to a dentist in Rotherham. By means of scholarships, he studied at Firth College and then in 1892 began medical study at Guy's Hospital Medical School. There he graduated MB in 1896 and MD in 1898 and held junior appointments until 1901. He qualified MRCP in 1899.

As a Gull Research Student, he worked in 1901 at Albrecht Kossel's laboratory in Heidelberg. Spriggs was appointed assistant physician in 1902 to the Royal Hospital for Diseases of the Chest, in 1903 to the Victoria Hospital for Children, and in 1904 to St George's Hospital, where he was also lecturer in pharmacology. He was elected FRCP in 1905 and became dean of the St George's Hospital Medical School.

In 1911, Spriggs developed pleurisy and in 1911 suffered a relapse, which lasted for 15 months. After a year of recovery at Nordrach-on-Dee Sanatorium, he accepted the offer of Dr. David Lawson to become a senior physician at a new clinic for gastric disorders. The clinic was at Duff House, Banff, for ten years before being moved to Ruthin Castle, North Wales. At Duff House, Spriggs published seventeen papers, including one on examination of the stomach with X-rays. From 1917 to 1918, he was a medical adviser to the Ministry of Food. He worked at the Ruthin Castle clinic until 1944 when he retired.

In 1923, with D. V. Pickering and A. J. Leigh, Spriggs recorded one of the earliest cases, if not the earliest in this country, of severe diabetes treated with insulin. A few years later (with J. H. Anderson) he was able to describe the recovery of the first two cases of pernicious anaemia treated in this country with the Minot-Murphy liver diet.

Spriggs was in 1906, the Oliver-Sharpey Lecturer, in 1935, the Croonian Lecturer, and in 1944, the Harveian Orator. He was made KCVO in 1935. He was High Sheriff of Denbighshire in 1945. He was a J.P. in Banffshire in 1919 and in Denbighshire in 1929.

On 31 August 1905, in Foxton he married Alice Mary Watson (b. 1879). They had two daughters, Josephine Mary (1906–1919) and Barbara (1908–1919), and two sons, Edmund Anthony (1918–1988) and Arthur Ivens (1919–2015). The two daughters died together from drowning in the ocean off the Banff seashore. Edmund A. Spriggs and Arthur I. Spriggs both became physicians and were elected FRCP. Edmund Ivens Spriggs married his second wife, Janet MacIntosh, in 1936. Lady Janet died in 1949 a few hours before Sir Edmund died.

Selected publications

with O. A. Marxer: 

with D. V. Pickering and A. J. Leigh: 
with O. A. Marxer:

References

External links

1871 births
1949 deaths
19th-century English medical doctors
20th-century English medical doctors
People educated at Wycliffe College, Gloucestershire
Alumni of the University of Sheffield
Physicians of Guy's Hospital
Physicians of St George's Hospital
Fellows of the Royal College of Physicians
Knights Commander of the Royal Victorian Order